Tony Baldinelli  (born November 24, 1964) is a Canadian politician who was elected to represent the riding of Niagara Falls in the House of Commons of Canada in the 2019 Canadian federal election as a Conservative. He held the seat for the Tories after its long-serving member of Parliament, former cabinet minister Rob Nicholson, retired. Prior to being elected, he had worked at Niagara Parks for 18 years. In September 2020, Conservative leader Erin O'Toole named Baldinelli his special adviser on Tourism Recovery.

Electoral record

Note: Canadian Alliance vote is compared to the Reform vote in 1997 election.

References

External links

Living people
Conservative Party of Canada MPs
People from Niagara Falls, Ontario
Members of the House of Commons of Canada from Ontario
Canadian politicians of Italian descent
1964 births